Hwang U-won (born 16 May 1962) is a South Korean weightlifter. He competed at the 1984 Summer Olympics and the 1988 Summer Olympics.

References

1962 births
Living people
South Korean male weightlifters
Olympic weightlifters of South Korea
Weightlifters at the 1984 Summer Olympics
Weightlifters at the 1988 Summer Olympics
Place of birth missing (living people)
Asian Games medalists in weightlifting
Weightlifters at the 1986 Asian Games
Weightlifters at the 1990 Asian Games
Asian Games gold medalists for South Korea
Medalists at the 1986 Asian Games
Medalists at the 1990 Asian Games
20th-century South Korean people
21st-century South Korean people